Odesa is a city on the Black Sea in the Odesa Raion in Odesa Oblast of Ukraine.

Odesa may also refer to:

Places
 Odesa Raion, Odesa Oblast, Ukraine
 Odesa Oblast, Ukraine
 Odesa International Airport, Odesa, Odesa, Odesa, Ukraine
 Odesa railway station, Odesa, Odesa, Odesa, Ukraine
 Odesa Soviet Republic, an SSR of the USSR later merged into the Ukrainian SSR

Sports
 HC Odesa, an ice hockey team in Odesa, Ukraine
 SC Odesa, a soccer team in Odesa, Ukraine
 FC Odesa, a soccer team in Odesa, Ukraine

See also

 Nova Odesa, Mykolaiv Oblast, Ukraine
 Nova Odesa Raion, Mykolaiv Oblast, Ukraine
 Odessa Mama (disambiguation) including Odesa Mama
 
 Odesza, U.S. electronica band
 Odessa (disambiguation)
 Odisha (disambiguation)
 Orissa (disambiguation)
 Edessa (disambiguation)